Sharp Glacier, is a glacier in northwestern Greenland. Administratively it belongs to the Avannaata municipality.

This glacier was named by Robert Peary after Benjamin Sharp (1858 – 1915), zoologist of the  Philadelphia Academy of Natural Sciences who took part in the Peary expedition to Greenland of 1891-1892.

Geography 
The Sharp Glacier discharges from the Greenland Ice Sheet and has its terminus in the northern side of the head of the Inglefield Fjord, NNW of Josephine Peary Island. Its last stretch lies between two nunataks: Mount Endicott in the western side, separating it from the Hart Glacier to the west. and Mount Asserson in the eastern side, separating it from the Melville Glacier to the east. 

The Sharp Glacier flows roughly from north to south.

See also
List of glaciers in Greenland
Inglefield Fjord

References

External links
Identifying Spatial Variability in Greenland's Outlet Glacier Response to Ocean Heat
Ice front and flow speed variations of marine-terminating outlet glaciers along the coast of Prudhoe Land, northwestern Greenland

Glaciers of Greenland